Yellow Brick Road may refer to:
Yellow brick road, the road of yellow brick in The Wizard of Oz

In music
Goodbye Yellow Brick Road, an album by Elton John
"Goodbye Yellow Brick Road" (song), a song from the album
Follow the Yellow Brick Road Tour, a 2014 tour promoting the re-release of the album
Yellow Brick Road (album), an album by Jerrod Niemann
"Yellow Brick Road", a song from the album The Hunters Lullaby by Raine Maida
"Yellow Brick Road", a song from the album Safe as Milk by Captain Beefheart
"Yellow Brick Road", a song from Encore (Eminem album)
"Yellow Brick Road", a song from the album Down the Way by Angus & Julia Stone
"The Yellow Brick Road Song", a song by Iyeoka

In film
YellowBrickRoad, a 2010 horror film

Other
As "Oz" is also a nickname for Australia, phrases like "down the yellow brick road" are sometimes used to mean "in Australia"
Yellow Brick Road, a long stoopway in Lechuguilla Cave
Walking Together On The Yellow Brick Road, an official audio drama for the anime series The Big O, written by Chiaki J. Konaka

See also 
Yellow Brick Road Casino
Follow the Yellow Brick Road